Georges Martin Witkowski (6 January 1867 – 12 August 1943) was a French conductor and composer.

Career
Born in Mostaganem, French Algeria, Witkowski started out in the army, becoming a cavalry officer and meeting Louis Vierne during that time. He later studied with Vincent d'Indy at the Schola Cantorum of Paris and, after settling in Lyon, was appointed director of the conservatory there in 1924.

He founded the "Société des Grands Concerts" in Lyon, forerunner of the Orchestre National de Lyon, which organized hundreds of concerts and introduced to the public the works of French composers such as Pierre de Bréville, Jacques Ibert, Paul Le Flem, André Caplet, Albert Roussel, Francis Poulenc, Jean Roger-Ducasse, Henri Rabaud, Pierre-Octave Ferroud and Adrien Rougier, as well as works by foreign composers such as Igor Stravinsky, Isaac Albéniz, Sergei Prokofiev, Arthur Honegger, Ottorino Respighi, Alexandre Glazounov, etc.

His son was the conductor and cellist Jean Witkowski.

Witkowski died in Lyon.

The list of Georges Martin Witkowski's compositions includes two symphonies and three operas among other works.

References

External links

Bibliography
 Rollin Smith:  (Pendragon Press, 1999), .

1867 births
1943 deaths
20th-century classical composers
20th-century French composers
20th-century French conductors (music)
20th-century French male musicians
French classical composers
French male classical composers
French male conductors (music)
People from Mostaganem
Pupils of Vincent d'Indy
Schola Cantorum de Paris alumni